South West Tasmania Resources Survey was a government funded and based project in Tasmania to collect and appraise information about the South West Tasmania region in a systematic manner.

The project and publications commenced in 1977, and completed in 1981

Peter Waterman, an academic geographer was the main editor and writer for the project

The papers were extensive, and covered most aspects of the resources, ecology and history of the region:

River catchment papers
The South West Tasmania region was assessed by broken up into catchment areas

 Bathurst Harbour-Old River catchment
 Davey River Catchment
 Franklin Catchment
 Lower Gordon Catchment
 Huon-Weld Catchment
 King River Catchment
 Lake Gordon-Lake Pedder Catchment
 Mackintosh-Murchison Catchment
 Macquarie Harbour Catchment
 New River - South Coast Catchment
 Picton Catchment
 Wanderer-Giblin Catchment

Archaeology

Occasional papers

See also 
 The South West Book

References

South West Tasmania
Books about Tasmania